Hu Weidong (born January 3, 1970, in Xuzhou, Jiangsu) is a former Chinese professional basketball player. At 6'6" (1.98 m) tall, and 210 lbs. (95 kg), he played as a point guard-shooting guard-small forward.

Professional career
In 1985, Hu joined the Jiangsu Dragons' junior teams. He was a two-time MVP (1996 and 1997) in the Chinese Basketball Association (CBA), and he led the league in scoring three times.

Considered to be China's version of National Basketball Association (NBA) megastar Michael Jordan, Hu was offered the chance to play in the NBA league in 1998, but he was injured when the Dallas Mavericks offered him a contract, and he thus failed to become the first Chinese to play in the NBA. He was then offered a short term 10-day contract with the Orlando Magic in 2000, but he was injured shortly after, and was unable to take up the offer.

Chinese national team
Hu represented the senior men's Chinese national basketball team from 1987 to 2002. Hu made a half court shot in the 1994 Goodwill Games, in which China collected the bronze medal, their only medal in non Asian play. He was the FIBA Asia Cup MVP in 1999.

Coaching career
From 2005 to 2008, Hu was the head coach of his former team as a player, the Jiangsu Dragons. He accepted the job as the head coach of the Jiangsu Dragons again in December, 2011.

External links

1971 births
Living people
Sportspeople from Xuzhou
Basketball players from Jiangsu
Point guards
Shooting guards
Jiangsu Dragons
Jiangsu Dragons players
Chinese men's basketball players
Olympic basketball players of China
Basketball players at the 1992 Summer Olympics
Basketball players at the 1996 Summer Olympics
Basketball players at the 2000 Summer Olympics
Asian Games medalists in basketball
Asian Games gold medalists for China
Asian Games silver medalists for China
Basketball players at the 1994 Asian Games
Basketball players at the 1998 Asian Games
Basketball players at the 2002 Asian Games
Medalists at the 1994 Asian Games
Medalists at the 1998 Asian Games
Medalists at the 2002 Asian Games
2002 FIBA World Championship players
Competitors at the 1994 Goodwill Games
1994 FIBA World Championship players